The Explorer Seamount is a seamount located in the Pacific Ocean off the coast of British Columbia, Canada. It is on the Explorer Ridge, a tectonic spreading centre that separates the Pacific and Explorer plates and so the volcanism is rift-related. It is the namesake of the Explorer Ridge.

Explorer Seamount is named after the Coast and Geodetic Survey ship Explorer, which ran from 1940 to 1943 in the northern Pacific Ocean and the Gulf of Alaska.

See also
Volcanism of Canada
Volcanism of Western Canada
List of volcanoes in Canada

Notes

References
British Columbia Marine Topography

Seamounts of the Pacific Ocean
Volcanoes of British Columbia
Rift volcanoes
Seamounts of Canada